Obotrita was a German barque, built in 1892 in Helsingør (Denmark). She had a tonnage of 1477 GRT and 1394 NRT and belonged to the Eug Celler company in Hamburg.  Her former name was Favorita. On November 16, 1925, the barque beached near Ostend, Belgium. 

Names:
Favorita 
Obotrita

References

Barques
Sailing ships of Germany
Ships built in Helsingør
Three-masted ships
Shipwrecks
Maritime incidents in 1925
1892 ships